Rune Gjeldnes (born 20 May 1971 in Surnadal) is a Norwegian adventurer. He completed his military education in 1992, when he met fellow adventurer-to-be Torry Larsen, also of Møre og Romsdal. Gjeldnes served in the Norwegian Naval Special Operations Command until 1997.

Expeditions
Together with Torry Larsen, Rune Gjeldnes travelled across Greenland in 1996. In 1997, he planned and completed the "Arctic Ocean 2000" expedition—a 109-day, 2,100-kilometer trip—becoming the first to cross the Arctic Ocean without resupplies. In 1998, Gjeldnes and Bjørn Loe became the first to paddle the Rio Merevari in Venezuela. Gjeldnes participated in North Pole expeditions in 1997 and 1998, crossed Baffin Island in northern Canada in 1998, and later the same year climbed Mt Aconcagua. From 1999 to 2000, he again worked for the Royal Norwegian Navy (RNoN).

The Longest March
In February 2006, Rune Gjeldnes completed "The Longest March", a three-month  solo ski trek across the South Pole region, becoming the first person to cross that area alone without being resupplied. His route went from Queen Maud Land, over the Pole, and on to Terra Nova Bay. The final couple of weeks of the journey had to be made on foot, as Gjeldnes had lost one of his mountain skis off his sled, this before having to descend a glacier of  ASL in order to reach his destination. The distance is the equivalent of the distance between New York City and San Francisco by road across the United States. The expedition had a scientific element as Gjeldnes took regular blood samples of himself to be used in studies of the human immune system under extreme conditions.

He now holds the records of the longest ski journey without being resupplied and the longest ski journey generally. He is the only person to ski across the North Pole, the South Pole and Greenland without resupply.

References

External links
Rune Gjeldnes – Official website
Arctic Ocean 2000 – Official expedition website
The Longest March web page – From the website of SEAL Adventure, Gjeldnes' company
The Longest March – Official expedition website
"Adventurer finishes polar trek" – By Arnfinn Mauren, Aftenposten, 3 February 2006
RNoN The Longest March page 

1971 births
Living people
Royal Norwegian Navy personnel
People from Møre og Romsdal
People from Surnadal